Allan Roderick Boath (born 14 February 1958 in Dundee, Scotland) is a former association football player, who represented New Zealand at international level.

Career
Having been developed as a player through the Celtic Boys Club, Boath signed for Dundee United but never played for the first team. He then played for Forfar Athletic for one season, making 15 appearances in the Scottish Football League.

Boath emigrated to New Zealand in 1978. He qualified to play for New Zealand through residency laws and made 38 A-International appearances for New Zealand, scoring six times.

He represented the All Whites for all three matches at the 1982 FIFA World Cup in Spain, where they lost to Scotland, USSR and Brazil.

References

External links

1958 births
Living people
1982 FIFA World Cup players
Dundee United F.C. players
Association football midfielders
Naturalised citizens of New Zealand
New Zealand international footballers
New Zealand association footballers
Scottish expatriate footballers
Scottish footballers
Scottish emigrants to New Zealand
Footballers from Dundee
National Soccer League (Australia) players
West Adelaide SC players
Expatriate association footballers in New Zealand
Forfar Athletic F.C. players
Scottish Football League players